Antti Virtanen is a Finnish professional ice hockey player who currently plays for JYP of the SM-liiga.

References

External links

Living people
JYP Jyväskylä players
Finnish ice hockey forwards
1977 births